The only official flag for Northern Ireland is the Union Flag, the flag of the United Kingdom; there is no official local flag that represents only Northern Ireland. The flying of various flags in Northern Ireland is a significant sectarian issue, with different communities identifying with different flags.

The Ulster Banner was used by the Northern Irish government from 1953 until the government and parliament were abolished in 1973. Since then, it has had no official status. However, it is still used as the flag of Northern Ireland by both loyalists and unionists and to represent Northern Ireland internationally in some sporting competitions, like the Commonwealth Games.

The Saint Patrick's Saltire represents Northern Ireland indirectly as Ireland in the Union Flag. It is sometimes flown during Saint Patrick's Day parades in Northern Ireland and is used to represent Northern Ireland during some royal events.

In recent years, there have been calls for a new, neutral flag for Northern Ireland, most recently as a recommendation by the Commission on Flags, Identity, Culture and Tradition in December 2021.

Flag of the Government of Northern Ireland (1924–1973)

The Ulster Banner, also known as the Red Hand Flag or the Ulster Flag (not to be confused with the provincial Flag of Ulster), was the flag that was granted a royal warrant for use to the Government of Northern Ireland in 1924. In common with other British flags, any civic status of the flag was not defined in law.

The Government of Northern Ireland was granted arms by royal warrant and had the right to display these arms on a flag or banner. This right was exercised for the coronation of Queen Elizabeth II in 1953 when the banner was flown for the first time over Parliament Buildings in honour of Elizabeth's visit. Also during her visit, on July 1, 1953, the Minister for Home Affairs announced that, while the Union Flag was the only standard officially recognised, those who wished to have a distinctive Ulster symbol might use the banner. When the Parliament of Northern Ireland was dissolved by the British government under the Northern Ireland Constitution Act 1973, the flag ceased to be used by a body with a royal warrant but remains the only flag  which represents Northern Ireland at international level in sport.

Since the Northern Ireland government and parliament were abolished in 1972, the use of the Ulster Banner among loyalists has increased.

Official use of flags
There are various practices for the flying of flags by public bodies in Northern Ireland. The Flags Regulations (Northern Ireland) Order 2000 requires that the Union Flag be flown over specified government buildings including Parliament Buildings and state offices on specified "named days" (honouring, for example Queen Elizabeth II's official birthday).

The regulations also provide that, on the occasion of a visit to a government building by the British Monarch, the Royal Standard shall be flown, and the Union Flag can be flown, and on state visits from other heads of state the Union Flag and the national flag of the country of the visitor can be flown. The regulations prohibit any flags being flown from the relevant buildings except as expressly permitted by the regulations.

When flags representing the "Home Countries" of England, Northern Ireland, Scotland and Wales are flown at official ceremonies, Northern Ireland is sometimes represented by the Saint Patrick's Cross, for instance on the barge Gloriana during the 2012 Thames Diamond Jubilee Pageant. In May 2016 the Ulster Banner was flown from horseback during the Musical Ride of the Household Cavalry at the Queen's 90th birthday celebration at Windsor, alongside the flags of England, Scotland and Wales.

Other regulations exist for other public bodies in Northern Ireland. Use of flags by the Police Service of Northern Ireland is governed by the Police Emblems and Flags Regulations (Northern Ireland) 2002, which provides that no flag shall be used by the service other than its own flag.

Local authorities
Legislation relating to flag flying does not apply to district council buildings, and district councils follow a range of practices varying from flying the Union Flag on a number of council buildings every day of the year as at Lisburn, to flying no flags on any building, flying only the council flag or flying flags on the designated days in the same way as government buildings.

In 2004, Belfast City Council commissioned a study on the flying of the Union Flag which noted that the Ulster Banner was flown alongside it by three unionist-controlled district councils at that time: Ards, Carrickfergus and Castlereagh. These councils have since been replaced.

Displaying flags

In Northern Ireland, some members from each of the unionist and nationalist communities use flags to declare their political allegiances and to mark territory. Unionists and loyalists fly the Union Flag and Ulster Banner to show their support for the union and/or their allegiance to Northern Ireland. Irish nationalists and republicans fly the Irish tricolour to show their support for a United Ireland.

After the 1998 Good Friday Agreement, flags continue to be a source of disagreement in Northern Ireland. The Agreement states that:

Nationalists pointed to this to argue that the use of the Union Flag for official purposes should be restricted, or that the Irish tricolour should be flown alongside the British flag on government buildings. Sinn Féin ministers in the power-sharing Northern Ireland Executive instructed that the Union Flag was not to fly from buildings operated by their respective departments. This power was removed from ministers by virtue of the Flag Regulations (Northern Ireland) Order 2000, mentioned above.

All signatories to the Good Friday Agreement also declare their acceptance of the "principle of consent" (i.e. that there will be no change to the constitutional position of Northern Ireland unless a majority votes for it), and Unionists argued that this provision amounts to recognising that the Union Flag is the only legitimate official flag in Northern Ireland. The problem was discussed in detail and various proposals made including suggestions for a new flag.

Flag proposals

Haass talks
In 2013, US diplomat Richard N. Haass chaired talks between the political parties in Northern Ireland dealing with, among other things, the issue of flags. The resulting draft proposals, which were not agreed to by the parties, included the idea of a new flag for Northern Ireland, and the possibility of a "circumscribed role for the sovereign flag of Ireland in conjunction with the Union flag."

Proposed "Civic Flag"
In December 2021, the Commission on Flags, Identity, Culture and Tradition published its final report which included a recommendation that a new "Civic Flag for Northern Ireland" should be adopted and be flown at buildings of the Northern Ireland Executive, Northern Ireland Assembly and local district councils in Northern Ireland. The commissions suggested that the design for the new flag should incorporate expressions of Britishness and Irishness and should also represent the diversity of the community in Northern Ireland. However, it was only floated as a possibility, with no apparent political will to explore the idea further.

International sport
The Ulster Banner is used to represent the Northern Ireland team at the Commonwealth Games, to represent golfers on the PGA Tour, and by FIFA to represent the Northern Ireland national football team.

See also

Northern Ireland flags issue
List of flags used in Northern Ireland
Coat of arms of Northern Ireland

References

External links

FOTW: Northern Ireland
CAIN: Flags in Northern Ireland
The Union Flags and flags of the United Kingdom

Northern Ireland